Horton Park railway station was a railway station on the Queensbury-Bradford section of the Queensbury Lines which ran between Bradford, Keighley and Halifax via Queensbury.

The station was built near to the Bradford Park Avenue football ground. It opened for passengers in 1880 closed for regular passenger trains in 1952 but remained open to special trains on match days until 1955. The station had a large goods yard which kept it open like the City Road Goods Branch until August 1972 when the yards and branch closed and the tracks were lifted.  The station remained in place along with its concrete sign until 2005 when the station was demolished to make way for a carpark for the new Al-Jamia Suffa-Tul-Islam Grand Mosque.

References

External links
 Horton Park station on navigable 1947 O. S. map

Disused railway stations in Bradford
Former Great Northern Railway stations
Railway stations in Great Britain opened in 1880
Railway stations in Great Britain closed in 1952